Tetrarhanis ilma is a butterfly in the family Lycaenidae. It is found in the Democratic Republic of the Congo, Angola, Uganda, Kenya and Tanzania. The habitat consists of primary forests.

Subspecies
T. i. ilma (Congo, Angola, Democratic Republic of the Congo: Mayumbe, Uele, Ituri, Tshopo, Equateur, Kinshasa, Sankuru, Lualaba and Shaba)
T. i. daltoni (Poulton, 1929) (south-western Uganda, north-western Tanzania)
T. i. lathyi (Joicey & Talbot, 1921) (Democratic Republic of the Congo: Kivu, Tanzania)
T. i. ugandae (Stempffer, 1964) (Uganda, western Kenya, north-western Tanzania)

References

External links
Die Gross-Schmetterlinge der Erde 13: Die Afrikanischen Tagfalter. Plate XIII 65 c

Butterflies described in 1873
Poritiinae
Butterflies of Africa
Taxa named by William Chapman Hewitson